The 1988 New Zealand tour rugby to Australia and Fiji was the 26th tour by the New Zealand national rugby union team to Australia.

The last tour of "All Blacks" in Australia was the 1984 tour, while Australian visit New Zealand in the 1986 tour. 

All Blacks won two test match on three and won the Bledisloe Cup.

The tour 
Scores and results list New Zealand's points tally first.

External links 
 New Zealand in Australia 1988 from rugbymuseum.co.nz

New Zealand
New Zealand tour
Australia tour
New Zealand national rugby union team tours of Australia